The discography of Mr Hudson, a British R&B and pop singer-songwriter, consists of two studio albums, 15 singles (including eight as a featured artist) and ten music videos. In 2009, he released his second studio album, Straight No Chaser, which included his first top five single, "Supernova", which featured Kanye West and peaked at number two in the United Kingdom. Straight No Chaser went on to debut at number 25 on the UK Albums Chart.

Studio albums

Singles

As lead artist

As featured artist

Guest appearances

Songwriting and production credits

Music videos

See also

As Mr Hudson and the Library

Studio albums

As BIGkids

Studio albums

Singles

References

Footnotes

Sources

External links
 
 
 
 
 Mr Hudson on Myspace

Discographies of British artists
Rhythm and blues discographies
Pop music discographies
 
Mr Hudson songs